Mercury Records released The Best of Reba McEntire in 1985 after McEntire had left the label for MCA. It includes two number one singles along with her more minor hits while on the label.

Track listing

Chart performance

Album

Certifications/sales

References 

1985 greatest hits albums
Albums produced by Jerry Kennedy
Reba McEntire compilation albums
Mercury Records compilation albums